The 1966–67 Michigan Wolverines men's basketball team represented the University of Michigan in intercollegiate basketball during the 1966–67 season.  The team finished the season in tenth place in the Big Ten Conference with an overall record of 8–16 and 2–12 against conference opponents.

Dave Strack was in his seventh year as the team's head coach.  Craig Dill was the team's leading scorer with 471 points in 24 games for an average of 19.5 points per game.  Dill also led the team with 209 rebounds.

Scoring statistics

Team players drafted into the NBA
Two players from this team were selected in the NBA Draft.

References

Michigan
Michigan Wolverines men's basketball seasons
Michigan Wolverines basketball
Michigan Wolverines basketball